Maisuradze (მაისურაძე) is a Georgian surname. Notable people with the surname include:

Grigol Maisuradze, Georgian painter
Irakli Maisuradze, Georgian footballer
Irakli Maysuradze, Georgian figure skater
Nodari Maisuradze, Russian pair skater of Georgian origin

Surnames of Georgian origin
Georgian-language surnames
Surnames of Abkhazian origin